Bärenthal is a municipality in the district of Tuttlingen in Baden-Württemberg, Germany.

History
Beuron Abbey gained possession of Bärenthal in 1751. It became a possession of the Principality of Hohenzollern-Sigmaringen in 1803 and was assigned to  until 1820 and then  until 1860. In 1938, the district of Wald was dissolved and Bärenthal was assigned to the newly-created Landkreis Sigmaringen. The village grew to about its present size in 1960 and has, since 1999, been the least-populated municipality in the district of Tuttlingen.

Geography
The municipality (Gemeinde) of Bärenthal is part of the Tuttlingen district of Baden-Württemberg, a state of the Federal Republic of Germany. It lies on the eastern extremity of the district, along its border with the Zollernalb district to the north. Elevation above sea level in the municipal area ranges from a high of  Normalnull (NN) in the north to a low of  NN along the Bära.

Portions of the Federally-protected Hüttenberg and  nature reserves are located in Bärenthal's municipal area.

Coat of arms
Bärenthal's coat of arms is divided into two fields: the upper field is yellow and contains a blue bear, walking to the left, while the lower is blue and contains a yellow "b" whose stem is crossed. The bear is a folk etymological reference to the Bära river as the origin of "Bärenthal", and the crossed "b" to Beuron Abbey, from whom the blue-yellow tincture is also derived. Official use was approved on 8 May 1973 by the Federal Ministry of the Interior, who also issued a municipal flag to Bärenthal on that date.

Transportation
The primary road in Bärenthal is the L440, following the Bära.

References

External links
  (in German)

Tuttlingen (district)